The Georgia Train and Equip Program (GTEP) was an American-sponsored 18-month, $64-million program aimed at increasing the capabilities of the Georgian armed forces by training and equipping four 600-man battalions with light weapons, vehicles and communications. The program enabled the US to expedite funding for the Georgian military for Operation Enduring Freedom.

On 27 February 2002, the US media reported that the U.S. would send approximately two hundred United States Army Special Forces soldiers to Georgia to train Georgian troops. The program implemented President Bush's decision to respond to the Government of Georgia's request for assistance to enhance its counter-terrorism capabilities and addressed the situation in the Pankisi Gorge. The program was planned to be a 20-month long, $64 million effort.

The move drew protests from many Russians. On 1 March 2002, in response to the domestic outcry, Russian president Vladimir Putin met with Georgian president Eduard Shevardnadze in Kazakhstan and pledged his support for the American military initiative.

The program began in May 2002 when American special forces soldiers of the 10th Special Forces Group began training select units of the Georgian Armed Forces, including the 12th Commando Light Infantry Battalion, the 16th Mountain-Infantry Battalion, the 13th "Shavnabada" Light Infantry Battalion, the 11th Light Infantry Battalion, a mechanized company, and small numbers of Interior Ministry troops and border guards. The goal of the program was to boost the proficiency of Georgia's security forces in areas including border security, anti-terrorism, disaster response.

Responsibility for training Georgian forces was eventually handed off to the U.S. Marine Corps in conjunction with the British Army.  British and American teams worked as part of a joint effort to train each of the four infantry battalion staffs and their organic rifle companies.  This training began with the individual soldier and continued through fire team, squad, platoon, company, and battalion level tactics as well as staff planning and organization. Upon completing training, each of the new Georgian infantry battalions began preparing for deployment rotations in support of the Global War on Terrorism. As part of the program Georgian troops were issued new uniforms, boots, weapons, and other articles of equipment.

Although GTEP formally ended in April 2004, US military assistance to Georgia continued through the Georgia Sustainment and Stability Operations Program. Part of this program involved preparing Georgian units for operations in US-led Multinational Force Iraq. That program ended in September 2007.

See also
Syrian Train and Equip Program

References

External links

http://www.defenselink.mil/releases/release.aspx?releaseid=3326 - original DOD press release
http://www.globalsecurity.org/military/ops/gtep.htm
http://www.eucom.mil/directorates/ecpa/operations/gtep/englishproducts/fact%5Fsheet5.htm&2

Military history of Georgia (country)
Counterterrorism in the United States
Operations involving American special forces
Non-combat military operations involving the United States
2002 in Georgia (country)
2003 in Georgia (country)
2004 in Georgia (country)